Mongolia Cup (MFF Tsom) is the top football knockout tournament in Mongolia.

List of Champions

2022/23 Tuv Buganuud FC (1)
2018/19 Erchim (8)
2017/18 Athletic 220
2016/17 Ulaanbaatar City (1)
2015/16 Khangarid (2)
2014/15 Erchim (7)
2013/14 Darkhan-Uul (1)
2012/13 Khangarid (1)
2011/12 Erchim (6)
2010/11 Erchim (5)
2001/02 FC Mon-Uran (2)
2000/01 FC Mon-Uran (1)
1999/00 Erchim (4)
1998/99 Delger (3)
1997/98 Erchim
1996/97 Erchim (2)
1995/96 Erchim (1)

Titles per Club

References

Football competitions in Mongolia
Mongolia